Detlef Bothe (born 24 July 1965) is a German actor, screenwriter, film director and producer. Since the early 1990s, he has appeared in numerous film and television productions, both German and international. In 2015, he appeared in the James Bond film Spectre as a henchman, in a scene where he and Q (Ben Whishaw) are seen riding a cable car in the Austrian Alps.

Bothe became a prominent on-screen representative of the Nazi leader Reinhard Heydrich as he has portrayed Heydrich in three films pertaining to his assassination: The 2011 Czech film Lidice, the 2016 British film Anthropoid, the 2020 Czech film Betrayer and in 2005 BBC documentary series about the Holocaust titled Auschwitz: The Nazis and the 'Final Solution'''. Bothe is often praised as "dead ringer" (twin) of Heydrich.

 Selected filmography 

1993: Tatort (TV Series) – Hubert
1992: Der Knappe des Kreuzes1995: Brother of Sleep – Lukas
1996: After Hours1996: Gegen den Wind (TV Series) – Eric
1997: 14 Days to Life – Rudi
1997:  – René
1998: Balko (TV Series) – Richie Schwingbrodt
1998: Appetite – Godfrey
1999: Sara Amerika – Jim J.
1999: Bang Boom Bang – Arne
1999: After the Truth – Siebert
1999: Schmetterlinge der Nacht – Killer's Helper
2000: The Calling – Scouser
2001: Himmlische Helden – Flex
2001: Ein göttlicher Job – Orkton
2001: 99euro-films – (segment "Ich schwöre") (segment "Loreley S.")
2001: Sass – Ede
2002: Feiertag (also writer, director and producer) – Ingo
2002: Vienna – Thomas
2002: Extreme Ops – Ratko
2003:  (TV Movie) – Fliege
2003: Baltic Storm – Victor Renko
2003: Gone – Eine tödliche Leidenschaft – Mike
2004:  – Matador
2004: Vinzent – Vinzent / Olaf Podesch
2004: Meine Frau, meine Freunde und ich (also writer, director and co-producer) – Richard Wippe
2005: Speer und Er (TV Mini-Series)
2005: Rose – Steve
2006: Die Rosenheim-Cops (TV Series) – Konrad Rottmann
2006:  – Bodyguard Ö
2006:  – Louis Doderer
2007: Neben der Spur – Dieter
2008:  (TV Movie) – Richter
2009: Mein – Klaus
2010: Snowman's Land – Harry
2010: Alles Liebe (TV Movie) – Mann aus Plattenladen
2010: Max Schmeling – Referee Arthur Donovan
2010:  (TV Movie) – Biedermeyer
2011: Lidice – Reinhard Heydrich
2011:  – Rocker
2011: Anonymus – John De Vere
2011: Pilgerfahrt nach Padua (TV Movie) – Mechaniker
2012: Nemez – Pfarrer
2012: Rommel – Carl Oberg
2012: Ludwig II – Bote
2013: Tatort (TV Series) – Volker Zahn
2013–2017: Hammer & Sichl (TV Series) – Apostolos
2014: Into the Suite (also writer, director and producer) – Paul Heitmann
2015: Ü 30 Paradiso (also writer, director and producer)
2015: Spectre – henchman in Cable Car #1 (Austria)
2016: Anthropoid – Reinhard Heydrich
2017: Die Vierhändige – Klinger
2020: Anatomie Zrady'' (Anatomy of Betrayal, Czech television film)- Reinhard Heydrich

References

External links 

 Official website

1965 births
Living people
German male stage actors
German male film actors
German male television actors
Mass media people from Braunschweig
20th-century German male actors
21st-century German male actors
Actors from Braunschweig